This is a list of Buddhist temples, monasteries, stupas, and pagodas in Vietnam for which there are Wikipedia articles, sorted by location.

An Giang
 Tây An Temple

Bắc Ninh
 Bút Tháp Temple
 Dâu Temple
 Phật Tích Temple

Bình Dương
 Hội Khánh Temple

Đà Lạt
 Linh Sơn Temple
 Trúc Lâm Temple

Đồng Nai
 Bửu Phong Temple

Hà Nội

 Láng Temple
 One Pillar Pagoda
 Perfume Temple
 Quán Sứ Temple
 Thầy Temple
 Trấn Quốc Pagoda
 Kim Liên Pagoda

Hồ Chí Minh City (Sài Gòn)

 Ấn Quang Temple
 Giác Lâm Temple
 Hoằng Pháp Temple
 Quan Âm Pagoda
 Thiên Hậu Temple
 Tịnh Xá Trung Tâm
 Vạn Hạnh Zen Temple
 Vĩnh Nghiêm Pagoda
 Xá Lợi Pagoda

Huế

 Báo Quốc Temple
 Diệu Đế Temple
 Quốc Ân Temple
 Thiên Mụ Temple
 Thuyền Tôn Temple
 Từ Đàm Temple

Hưng Yên
 Chuông Temple

Kiên Giang
 Sắc Tứ Tam Bảo Temple

Ninh Bình
 Bái Đính Temple

Nam Định
 Phổ Minh Temple

Nha Trang

 Long Sơn Temple

Phú Yên
 Phước Sơn Temple
 Thuyền Tôn Temple

Thái Bình
 Keo Temple

Tiền Giang
 Vĩnh Tràng Temple

Vũng Tàu
 Thích Ca Phật Đài

See also
 Vietnamese architecture
 Buddhism in Vietnam
 List of Buddhist temples

Notes

External links

 BuddhaNet's Comprehensive Directory of Buddhist Temples sorted by country
 Buddhactivity Dharma Centres database

 
 
Vietnam
Buddhist temples